Chalbury is a village in the English county of Dorset. It lies on the southern edge of Cranborne Chase within the East Dorset administrative district of the county, four miles north of Wimborne Minster and four miles west of Verwood. The village is sited on Chalbury Hill, the view from which has been described as "one of the most fascinating in the county". The Dorset broadcaster Ralph Wightman wrote of the hill and its view:
"Here there is a hill which is only three hundred feet high but which manages to give a wonderful view over woodland, heath, fertile chalk and the distant Isle of Wight. This feeling of immense space seen from relatively small hills is a blessed peculiarity of Dorset."
The village has a population of 140 (2001). Journalist Mary Frances Billington was born at Chalbury in 1862, while her father was the rector at All Saints' Church.

References

External links 

 Census data
Photographs and Information on Chalbury Church from Strolling Guides

Villages in Dorset
Civil parishes in Dorset